The 1976–77 Marquette Warriors men's basketball team represented Marquette University in the 1976–77 NCAA Division I men's basketball season. The Warriors played their home games at the MECCA Arena in Milwaukee, Wisconsin as a Division I Independent. 

They were led by head coach Al McGuire in his 13th and final year at Marquette. The Warriors finished the season 25–7. They received a bid to the NCAA tournament where they defeated Cincinnati, Kansas State, and Wake Forest to advance to the Final Four. At the Final Four, they defeated UNC Charlotte to advance to the National Championship game where they defeated North Carolina to win the National Championship.

Butch Lee, the tournament’s most outstanding player, and Bo Ellis were the stars of a team that reflected the street-wise toughness of its coach. In the final AP poll released prior to the Sweet Sixteen, Marquette moved from sixteenth to seven in  Following the season, head coach Al McGuire retired.

Since this season, Marquette has returned to the Final Four only once, in 2003.

Roster

Schedule and results

|-
!colspan=9 style=|Regular season

|-
!colspan=9 style=| NCAA Tournament

Awards and honors
 Butch Lee, NCAA Men's MOP Award

Team players drafted into the NBA
1977 NBA draft

References

External links
Sports Reference – Marquette Warriors – 1976–77 basketball season

Marquette Golden Eagles
Marquette Golden Eagles men's basketball seasons
NCAA Division I men's basketball tournament championship seasons
NCAA Division I men's basketball tournament Final Four seasons
Marquette
Marq
Marq